The Christa Sevika Sangha (Handmaids of Christ), CSS, is an Anglican religious order for women based in Jobarpar, Barisal, Bangladesh.  It is a part of the Anglican Church of Bangladesh.

History
In 1970 the Sisterhood of the Epiphany, a group of largely British-ethnicity sisters working in Bangladesh, formed a parallel community for sisters of Bangladeshi nationality, and chose the name Christa Sevika Sangha (Handmaids of Christ). The key founder was Sr Susila SE. In 1986 the order became fully independent. At that time the foundress, Sr Susila SE, left the Sisterhood of the Epiphany to become the first Mother Superior CSS, an office she continued to hold until her death on 16 May 2011. In total she led the community for 41 years, and was Mother Superior for 26 years. The Sevikas have a longstanding attachment to the Oxford Mission, and are often referred to simply as the "Oxford Mission Sisters".

Work
The sisters supervise hostels for young girls, and a play centre for small children. They are involved in work at local schools and other community projects. They offer a four-fold daily office in Bengali language, as well as a daily eucharist, and a daily informal quiet prayer session.

References
Anglican Religious Communities Yearbook: 2006-2007. Norwich: Canterbury Press, 2005.

Notes

External links
The Oxford Mission homepage
Information from the Anglican Communion office

Anglican orders and communities
Christian organizations established in 1970
1970 establishments in Pakistan